Girls Talk may refer to:

 "Girls Talk" (Elvis Costello song), first recorded by Dave Edmunds and later by Linda Ronstadt
 "Girls Talk" (Garbage song)
 Girl's Talk, an album by Kara
"Girl's Talk", a song by Loona from Chuu

See also 

 Girl Talk (disambiguation)